Williamson School is an abandoned train station located on Station Drive near New Middletown Road in Middletown Township, Pennsylvania.  The station was a stop on the Pennsylvania Railroad's West Chester Line. It later became a part of SEPTA's R3 West Chester.

The station, and all of those west of Elwyn, was closed in September 1986, due to deteriorating track conditions and Chester County's desire to expand facilities at Exton station on SEPTA's Paoli/Thorndale Line. Service was "temporarily suspended" at that time, with substitute bus service provided. Williamson School station still appears in publicly posted tariffs.

The original station is located on the grounds of the Williamson College of the Trades, serving primarily students and faculty. SEPTA service to Wawa station does not include an intermediate stop at Williamson School, although the service restoration project provides for construction of a new station if demand warrants.

References

External links
Official school website: The Williamson Free School of Mechanical Trades  
Existing Railroad Stations in Delaware County, Pennsylvania

Railway stations in the United States opened in 1888
Railway stations closed in 1986
Former SEPTA Regional Rail stations
Stations on the West Chester Line
Former Pennsylvania Railroad stations
Former railway stations in Delaware County, Pennsylvania
1888 establishments in Pennsylvania
1986 disestablishments in Pennsylvania